Flaming Feather is a 1952 Technicolor Western film directed by Ray Enright and starring Sterling Hayden. The film was shot on location around Oak Creek Canyon near Sedona, Arizona, and at the Montezuma Castle National Monument near Sedona. The local Yavapai Indians, who were employed as extras on the production, refused to enter the cliff dwellings because they represented the "dwelling place of the dead." Consequently, production was delayed while a band of Navajos was brought in from a reservation 137 miles away to replace them.

Plot
A mysterious outlaw, known only as the Sidewinder (Victor Jory), is terrorizing Arizona settlers. A rancher whose property was raided, Tex McCloud (Hayden), and a U.S. Cavalry officer named Blaine (Forrest Tucker) both decide to seek justice. They even make a friendly wager over which one will get to the Sidewinder first.

A wealthy saloon entertainer, Carolina (Arleen Whelan), tries to persuade Tex to also go after Lucky Lee, a mine owner who owes her $20,000. She also tries to seduce Tex, but he is not interested.

After he changes hotel rooms with Lucky's longtime sweetheart, Nora Logan (Barbara Rush), an ambush is attempted by gambler Showdown Calhoun (Richard Arlen) and his partner, who come to the wrong room. Nora is the one they are after, and she becomes a kidnap victim on the stagecoach. For the second time, though, Tex rides to her rescue.

Nora explains that she is involved with Lucky only out of gratitude for one saving her from a similar assault. Lucky offers a theory that Tombstone Jack is the notorious Sidewinder, but after Carolina sneaks up on Tombstone and kills him, Tex and Blaine begin to suspect that Lucky is the man they are after. Turquoise (Carol Thurston), a Ute woman who loves Lucky, knows for a fact he is the outlaw.

Now the marshal for the territory, Tex and a posse go after Lucky, who has snatched Nora and ridden off to a hideout. Lucky conspires with a band of Utes to attack the posse. Carolina and Showdown are killed. Tex and Blaine get to the hideout, but the jealous Turquoise has already killed Lucky, beating them to the punch. The men call off their wager.

Cast
 Sterling Hayden as Tex McCloud
 Forrest Tucker as Lt. Tom Blaine
 Arleen Whelan as Carolina
 Barbara Rush as Nora Logan
 Victor Jory as Lucky Lee aka Sidewinder
 Richard Arlen as Eddie 'Showdown' Calhoun
 Edgar Buchanan as Sgt. O'Rourke
 Carol Thurston as Turquoise
 Ian MacDonald as Tombstone Jack
 George Cleveland as Doc Fallon

See also
 Sterling Hayden filmography

References

External links
 
 
 
 

1952 films
1950s English-language films
1952 Western (genre) films
Films directed by Ray Enright
American Western (genre) films
Films scored by Paul Sawtell
1950s American films